The WABA Champions Cup 2004 was the 7th staging of the WABA Champions Cup, the basketball club tournament of West Asia Basketball Association. The tournament was held in Damascus, Syria between April 12 and April 16. The top two teams qualify for the 2004 FIBA Asia Champions Cup.

Standings

Results

References
 www.sagessefans.com

2004
International basketball competitions hosted by Syria
2003–04 in Asian basketball
2003–04 in Jordanian basketball
2003–04 in Iranian basketball
2003–04 in Lebanese basketball
2004 in Syrian sport
2004 in Iraqi sport
Events in Damascus